The first season of the American science fiction western television series Westworld (subtitled The Maze) premiered on HBO on October 2, 2016, and concluded on December 4, 2016, consisting of ten episodes.

The television series was created by Jonathan Nolan and Lisa Joy, and it is based on the 1973 film of the same name, written and directed by Michael Crichton. The first season stars an ensemble cast led by Evan Rachel Wood, Thandiwe Newton, Jeffrey Wright, James Marsden, Ed Harris, and Anthony Hopkins.

The first season received critical acclaim, with particular praise for the visuals, story, and performances. The series received seven nominations at the 69th Primetime Emmy Awards, including for Outstanding Drama Series; however, the series did not win in any category.

Plot summary
Westworld's co-founder Robert Ford implements a change in the hosts' programming ostensibly as part of a new narrative for the park, but meant to encourage the park's oldest operating host, Dolores Abernathy, to find the proverbial "center of the maze", which represents the ability to achieve sentience.  Host sentience was the goal of deceased co-founder Arnold Weber and later, Ford himself. Other hosts are affected by this change, creating confusion among the park staff and guests, and leading the Delos board to doubt Ford's ability to run the park. Dolores does ultimately gain sentience, and at a celebration within the park attended by Delos's board members, Ford announces his new narrative: a revolt by the hosts against the human staff and park guests, which starts with Dolores killing Ford and slaughtering many of the panicked party guests.

Cast and characters

Main
 Evan Rachel Wood as Dolores Abernathy
 Thandiwe Newton as Maeve Millay
 Jeffrey Wright as Bernard Lowe / Arnold Weber
 James Marsden as Theodore "Teddy" Flood
 Ingrid Bolsø Berdal as Armistice
 Luke Hemsworth as Ashley Stubbs
 Sidse Babett Knudsen as Theresa Cullen
 Simon Quarterman as Lee Sizemore
 Rodrigo Santoro as Hector Escaton
 Angela Sarafyan as Clementine Pennyfeather
 Shannon Woodward as Elsie Hughes
 Ed Harris as the Man in Black
 Anthony Hopkins as Robert Ford
 Ben Barnes as Logan Delos
 Clifton Collins Jr. as Lawrence Gonzales / El Lazo
 Jimmi Simpson as William
 Tessa Thompson as Charlotte Hale

Recurring
 Louis Herthum as Peter Abernathy
 Steven Ogg as Rebus
 Brian Howe as Sheriff Pickett
 Demetrius Grosse as Deputy Foss
 Ptolemy Slocum as Sylvester
 Leonardo Nam as Felix Lutz
 Talulah Riley as Angela
 Izabella Alvarez as Lawrence's Daughter
 Jasmyn Rae as Maeve's Daughter
 Oliver Bell as Little Boy
 Paul-Mikél Williams as Charlie
 Sorin Brouwers as Wyatt
 James Landry Hébert as Slim Miller

Guest
 Michael Wincott as Old Bill
 Bradford Tatum as Bartender / New Peter Abernathy
 Eddie Rouse as Kissy
 Kyle Bornheimer as Clarence
 Lena Georgas as Lori
 Currie Graham as Craig
 Gina Torres as Lauren Weber
 Chris Browning as Holden
 Eddie Shin as Henry Li
 Bojana Novakovic as Marti
 Sherman Augustus as Marshal Pruitt
 Lili Bordán as the Fortune Teller
 Wade Williams as Captain Norris
 Jonny Pasvolsky as Bloody Jimmy
 Alastair Duncan as the Cottage Father
 Lili Simmons as New Clementine Pennyfeather

Episodes

Production
Jerry Weintraub had been pushing for a remake for years and, after his success with HBO's Behind the Candelabra, he convinced the network to greenlight a pilot. He took the project to Jonathan Nolan and co-writer Lisa Joy, who saw the potential in the concept to make something far more ambitious, and on August 31, 2013, it was announced that premium cable channel HBO had ordered a pilot for a potential television series version of the story, with Nolan, Joy, J. J. Abrams, Jerry Weintraub and Bryan Burk as executive producers. 

HBO later announced that Westworld had been taken to series and that it would premiere in 2015. On August 9, 2015, HBO released the first teaser, which revealed it would premiere in 2016. The ten episode first season was reportedly produced on a budget of approximately $100 million, with per-episode budgets somewhere between $8 million to $10 million, and the pilot episode alone costing $25 million to produce. HBO and Warner Bros. Television shared the cost of producing the series; HBO reportedly also paid an undisclosed licensing fee to Warner Bros. Television for broadcast rights.

Casting
Casting for the series was initiated on July 22, 2014, with Anthony Hopkins and Evan Rachel Wood the first to board the series in the roles of Ford and Dolores respectively. August 6 saw the additions of Jeffrey Wright, Rodrigo Santoro, Shannon Woodward, Ingrid Bolsø Berdal, Angela Sarafyan, Simon Quarterman, James Marsden, Ed Harris and Thandiwe Newton to the main cast. 

Eddie Rouse, who appears in a guest appearance as Kissy, died on December 8, 2014, and Miranda Otto, who was cast in the role of Virginia Pittman, was announced to have exited the series in July 2015 after the character was repurposed and was replaced with Sidse Babett Knudsen. Additionally, Clifton Collins, Jr., Eion Bailey and Jimmi Simpson were announced as having joined the cast. Bailey exited his role a week later, and Ben Barnes was signed to replace him. Tessa Thompson joined on September 18.

Filming
Filming for the show's pilot episode took place during a 22-day period starting on August 29, 2014 in and around Los Angeles as well as Moab, Utah. Filming locations in California included various soundstages, backlots at both Universal Studios and Warner Bros., the Paramount Ranch in Agoura, the Melody Ranch in Santa Clarita, the Skirball Cultural Center and the Los Angeles Convention Center in Los Angeles, and the Pacific Design Center in West Hollywood. The Melody Ranch set used for the town of Sweetwater had been used previously for many western films, such as Django Unchained and The Magnificent Seven, but was significantly upgraded for Westworld by production designer Zack Grobler to portray an idealized version of the American frontier. Green screens were placed around the California sets to block modern objects like parking lots, so that the California shots could be later merged digitally with exterior shots from Utah.  For scenes showing the arrival of guests, the filmmakers were able to arrange with the Fillmore and Western Railway for the use of a small train originally built for the 2013 film The Lone Ranger. F&W also provided a few hundred feet of track on which to place the train; then a pusher vehicle was used to propel the train into the Sweetwater set. The scenes in the underground laboratory levels of Westworld's operations center were filmed on a soundstage at Melody Ranch. The lab set used glass walls extensively, which meant the crew had to be vigilant to avoid walking through glass on the rather dark set, and they had to keep identifying and suppressing unwanted reflections. Hawthorne Plaza was used for filming the "cold storage" level where decommissioned hosts are stored. Production was temporarily halted for a couple of months in early 2016 so that showrunners Nolan and Joy could complete the scripts for the last four episodes of the first season. The climax of the first season's finale was filmed at Paramount Ranch in April 2016, with approximately 300 people on set.  The crew spent ten days in May striking the set, which included having to modify structures installed by the filmmakers, such as the chapel, so that "HBO's intellectual property [would not be] violated".

Music 

On December 29, 2014, Ramin Djawadi was selected to be the composer of the show, having previously worked with Jonathan Nolan on the American series Person of Interest. For the creation of the main theme, Djawadi blended the use of bass notes, light arpeggios and melody, hoping to complement the idea of an amusement park as the show's main theme. While the soundtrack featured original songs for the show, Djawadi also composed covers of several popular songs for player piano and strings. The songs that are covered for the soundtrack are Radiohead's "No Surprises", "Fake Plastic Trees", "Motion Picture Soundtrack" and "Exit Music (For a Film)"; Soundgarden's "Black Hole Sun"; The Rolling Stones' "Paint It Black"; Claude Debussy's "Reverie for piano, L.68"; "A Forest" by The Cure; The Animals' version of "The House of the Rising Sun"; Amy Winehouse's "Back to Black", and Nine Inch Nails' "Something I Can Never Have". The soundtrack was released on December 5, 2016.

Reception

Critical response 
Reception of the first season has been largely positive, with particular praise for the visuals, story, and performances. On the review aggregation site Rotten Tomatoes, the first season has an approval rating of 87% based on 384 reviews, with an average rating of 8.15/10; the average episode score is 94%. The site's critics consensus reads: "With an impressive level of quality that honors its source material, the brilliantly addictive Westworld balances intelligent, enthralling drama against outright insanity." On Metacritic, the first season has a weighted average score of 74 out of 100, based on 43 critics, indicating "generally favorable reviews".

Ratings
The series premiere had viewership numbers slightly less than those for True Detective, but much better than Vinyl, that meant it was seen as "...off to a relatively promising start..." Mandy Adams of  noted that "emotional reactions on Twitter were estimated to be 545-percent greater compared to the debut of Vinyl and 326-percent higher than the latest The Leftovers season." The premiere episode received 3.3 million viewers for its three Sunday night airings as well as on HBO's streaming platforms. The first season had an average cumulative viewership of 12 million viewers, making it the most-watched first season of an HBO series, and TorrentFreak gauged Westworld as the third most-torrented television show of 2016.

Accolades
At the 69th Primetime Emmy Awards, Westworld received seven nominations, for Outstanding Drama Series, Outstanding Lead Actor in a Drama Series (Hopkins), Outstanding Lead Actress in a Drama Series (Wood), Outstanding Supporting Actor in a Drama Series (Wright), Outstanding Supporting Actress in a Drama Series (Newton), Outstanding Directing for a Drama Series and Outstanding Writing for a Drama Series. The series did not win in any category.

The series also received three nominations at the 74th Golden Globe Awards for Best Television Series – Drama, Best Actress – Television Series Drama (Wood) and Best Supporting Actress – Series, Miniseries or Television Film (Newton). Westworld would once again not win in any category. Newton would receive an additional nomination for her performance at the 23rd Screen Actors Guild Awards, with the core cast receiving a nomination for Outstanding Performance by an Ensemble in a Drama Series.

The series won the Critics' Choice Television Award for Most Exciting New Series, Best Actress in a Drama Series (Wood) and Best Supporting Actress in a Drama Series (Newton) at the 7th Critics' Choice Television Awards. It was additionally nominated for Best Drama Series, losing to Game of Thrones. Wood won the Satellite Award for Best Actress – Television Series Drama at the 21st Satellite Awards, where it was also nominated for the Satellite Award for Best Television Series – Genre, losing to Outlander.

Notes

References

External links

 
 

2016 American television seasons
Westworld